Joseph Dervin (November 4, 1914 – June 20, 2005) was an American film editor. He was nominated for three Primetime Emmy Awards in the category Outstanding Picture Editing for his work on the television programs The Man from U.N.C.L.E. and Longstreet. Dervin died in June 2005 of natural causes in Calabasas, California, at the age of 90.

References

External links 

1914 births
2005 deaths
People from Somerville, Massachusetts
American film editors
American television editors